Outdoor Classic or outdoor classic may refer to:

 AHL Outdoor Classic, series of annual outdoor ice hockey games in the AHL
 Liberty Outdoor Classic, first outdoor pro regular season basketball game
 NHL Outdoor Classic, National Hockey League outdoor games
 2016 Outdoor Women's Classic, first outdoor pro game in women's ice hockey (NWHL+CWHL interleague play)

See also
 Classic (disambiguation)#Sports
 Classics (disambiguation)#Sports